Elections were held in Ilocos Region for seats in the House of Representatives of the Philippines on May 9, 2016.

The candidate with the most votes won that district's seat for the 17th Congress of the Philippines.

Summary

Ilocos Norte

1st District
Incumbent Rodolfo Fariñas is running

2nd District
Imelda Marcos is the incumbent. She changed her party affiliation from KBL to Nacionalista.

Ilocos Sur

1st District
Incumbent Ronald Singson is not running. His party nominated incumbent Vice Governor Deogracias Victor Savellano.

2nd District
Eric Singson is the incumbent.

La Union

1st District
Incumbent Victor Francisco Ortega is term limited and is running for Mayor of San Fernando City.

2nd District
Eufranio Eriguel is not running.

Pangasinan

1st District
Jesus Celeste is the incumbent.

2nd District
Leopoldo Bataoil is the incumbent. He changed his party affiliation from NPC to Liberal.

3rd District

4th District
Incumbent Gina de Venecia is not running.

5th District
Carmen Cojuangco is the incumbent.

6th District
Incumbent Marilyn Primicias-Agabas is running unopposed.

References

External links
Official COMELEC results 2016

2016 Philippine general election
Lower house elections in the Ilocos Region